The 2021 Fanatec GT World Challenge Europe Sprint Cup was the ninth season of the GT World Challenge Europe Sprint Cup following on from the demise of the SRO Motorsports Group's FIA GT1 World Championship (an auto racing series for grand tourer cars) and the second season after title sponsor Blancpain withdrew sponsorship. The season began on 7 May at Circuit de Nevers Magny-Cours in France and ended on 26 September at Circuit Ricardo Tormo in Valencia.

Calendar

Entry List

Race results
Bold indicates overall winner.

Championship standings
Scoring system
Championship points are awarded for the first ten positions in each race. The pole-sitter also receives one point and entries are required to complete 75% of the winning car's race distance in order to be classified and earn points. Individual drivers are required to participate for a minimum of 25 minutes in order to earn championship points in any race.

Drivers' championships

Overall

Notes
  – Drivers did not finish the race but were classified, as they completed more than 75% of the race distance.

Silver Cup

Pro/Am Cup

Team's championships

Overall

Silver Cup

Pro/Am Cup

See also 

 2021 GT World Challenge Europe
 2021 GT World Challenge Europe Endurance Cup
 2021 GT World Challenge Asia
 2021 GT World Challenge America
 2021 GT World Challenge Australia

Notes

References

External links 

 

World Challenge Europe